Juvigny Val d'Andaine is a commune in the department of Orne, northwestern France. The municipality was established on 1 January 2016 by merger of the former communes of La Baroche-sous-Lucé, Beaulandais, Juvigny-sous-Andaine (the seat), Loré, Lucé, Saint-Denis-de-Villenette and Sept-Forges.

See also 
Communes of the Orne department

References 

Communes of Orne
Populated places established in 2016
2016 establishments in France